The 1985 East Coast Conference men's basketball tournament was held March 2–4, 1985.  The champion gained and an automatic berth to the NCAA tournament.

Bracket and results
{{8TeamBracket
| group1 =
| group2 =

| RD1=QuarterfinalsSaturday, March 2
| RD2=SemifinalsSunday, March 3
| RD3=FinalMonday, March 4

| RD1-seed1  = 1
| RD1-team1  = 
| RD1-score1 = 79*
| RD1-seed2  = 8
| RD1-team2  = 
| RD1-score2 = 77

| RD1-seed3  = 4
| RD1-team3  = 
| RD1-score3 = 59
| RD1-seed4  = 5
| RD1-team4  = 
| RD1-score4 = 58

| RD1-seed5  = 3
| RD1-team5  = Drexel| RD1-score5 = 56
| RD1-seed6  = 6
| RD1-team6  = | RD1-score6 = 58| RD1-seed7  = 2
| RD1-team7  = 
| RD1-score7 = 74
| RD1-seed8  = 7
| RD1-team8  = | RD1-score8 = 75| RD2-seed1  = 1
| RD2-team1  = Bucknell| RD2-score1 = 74| RD2-seed2  = 4
| RD2-team2  = Rider
| RD2-score2 = 62

| RD2-seed3  = 6
| RD2-team3  = Lehigh| RD2-score3 = 72| RD2-seed4  = 7
| RD2-team4  = Hofstra
| RD2-score4 = 68

| RD3-seed1  = 1
| RD3-team1  = Bucknell
| RD3-score1 = 74
| RD3-seed2  = 6
| RD3-team2  = Lehigh| RD3-score2 = 76*'}}

* denotes overtime game

All-Tournament Team
 Leroy Allen, Hofstra
 Jaye Andrews, Bucknell
 Tony Duckett, Lafayette
 Mike Polaha, Lehigh – Tournament MVP''
 Daren Queenan, Lehigh
 Chris Seneca, Bucknell

Source

References

East Coast Conference (Division I) men's basketball tournament
Tournament